KLLP (98.5 FM, "Star 98") is a radio station broadcasting a hot adult contemporary format. Licensed to Blackfoot, Idaho, United States, the station serves the Pocatello area. The station is currently owned by Rich Broadcasting.

History
The station was assigned the calls KRCD on 1986-05-01. It was originally at 98.3 with a Contemporary Hits format.  On 1991-11-01 it changed to KRSS “Cross” at 98.5 with a Christian format.  On 1998-11-09 the station changed to the current KLLP call letters, first branded as “K-Lite” with an Adult Contemporary format.  By the early 2000s, it became “Star 98.5” with its current Hot Adult Contemporary format.

References

External links
Official Website
Flash Stream

LLP
Hot adult contemporary radio stations in the United States
Radio stations established in 1987
1987 establishments in Idaho